The men's marathon 10 kilometres competition of the swimming events at the 2011 Pan American Games took place on the 22 of October at the API Maritime Terminal in Puerto Vallarta. The defending Pan American Games champion was Fran Crippen of the United States.

Schedule
All times are Central Standard Time (UTC-6).

Results
17 competitors from 12 countries are scheduled to compete.

References

External links
Schedule

Swimming at the 2011 Pan American Games
Pan American Games